Kaburgediği is a village in Tarsus district of Mersin Province, Turkey. The population of village was 114  as of 2012.

References

Villages in Tarsus District
Yaylas in Turkey